The Rani of Jhansi Regiment was the women's regiment of the Indian National Army, the armed force formed by Indian nationalists in 1942 in Southeast Asia with the aim of overthrowing the British Raj in colonial India, with Japanese assistance. It was one of the all-female combat regiments of the Second World War on all sides. Led by Captain Lakshmi Swaminathan (better known as Lakshmi Sahgal), the unit was raised in July 1943 with volunteers from the expatriate Indian population in Southeast Asia. The unit was named the "Rani Jhansi Regiment" after Rani Lakshmi Bai, Rani of Jhansi, a renowned Indian queen and freedom fighter.

Establishment
Bose announced the formation of the Regiment on 12 July 1943. Most of the women were teenage volunteers of Indian descent from Malayan rubber estates; very few had ever been to India. The initial nucleus of the force was established with its training camp in Singapore with approximately a hundred and seventy cadets. The cadets were given ranks of non-commissioned officer or sepoy (private) according to their education. Later, camps were established in Rangoon and Bangkok and by November 1943, the unit had more than three hundred cadets.

Training

Training in Singapore began on 23 October 1943. The recruits were divided into sections and platoons and were accorded ranks of Non-Commissioned Officers and Sepoys according to their educational qualifications.  These cadets underwent military and combat training with drills, route marches as well as weapons training in rifles, hand grenades, and bayonet charges. Later, a number of the cadets were chosen for more advanced training in jungle warfare in Burma. The Regiment had its first passing out parade at the Singapore training camp of five hundred troops on 30 March 1944.

Some 200 of the cadets were also chosen for nursing training, forming the Chand Bibi Nursing Corps.

Service
During the INA's Imphal campaign, an initial contingent of nearly a hundred of the Rani of Jhansi troops moved to Maymyo, part of which was intended to form a vanguard unit to enter the Gangetic plains of Bengal after the expected fall of Imphal. A part of the unit also formed the nursing corps at the INA hospital at Maymyo.
Following the failure of the siege of Imphal and the INA's disastrous retreat, the Rani troops were tasked with coordinating the relief and care of the INA troops who arrived at Monywa and to Maymyo and were not used in combat.

End of the regiment
After the fall of Rangoon and the withdrawal of the Azad Hind government and Subhas Chandra Bose from the city and through Burma, the troops originally from Burma were allowed to disband, while the remainder of the regiment retreated along with the retreating Japanese forces on foot and, when available, on mechanised transport. During the retreat, it suffered some attacks both from Allied air attacks, as well as from the Burmese resistance forces. The total number of casualties suffered is not known. The unit later disbanded.

See also
Lakshmi Sahgal
Indian National Army
Janaky Athi Nahappan
Women in the military

Footnotes

Sources

External links
The Women's Regiment. National Archives of Singapore.
"Freedom To Us: Intensive training of the Women troops of the Indian National Army", Nippon News, No. 204. in the official website of NHK.

All-female military units and formations
Military units and formations of the Indian National Army
Indian independence movement
Indian women of World War II
Women in war 1900–1945
Military history of India during World War II
Indian National Army
1943 establishments in India